Metamorpha is a monotypic butterfly genus in the family Nymphalinae. Its one species, Metamorpha elissa, is found in Suriname.

References

Nymphalidae of South America
Monotypic butterfly genera
Taxa named by Jacob Hübner